Puyuhuapi Volcanic Group is a volcanic group of cinder cones located at the head of Puyuhuapi Channel, in the Aysén del General Carlos Ibáñez del Campo Region of Chile.

Puyuhuapi is one of the volcanoes in the southern segment of the Andean Southern Volcanic Zone, which includes a number of stratovolcanoes. South of this southern segment, a gap without volcanic activity separates the Southern Volcanic Zone from the Austral Volcanic Zone.

The volcanic field extends from the western side of the channel north over the head of the channel towards Lake Risopatrón, with one isolated cone found on the eastern side of the channel. The town of Puyuhuapi is located approximately halfway through the field. The cones on the western side are a separate group from the ones towards the north and associated with two different eruption fissures, but both fissures are associated with the Liquiñe-Ofqui fault zone. The basement on which the field is built is formed by rocks of the Patagonian Batholith.

The field is formed by cinder cones, while the isolated centre is formed by a fissure fed lava flow. The eruption fissures also generated lava flows; the cones formed afterwards over the fissures. On the northern end of the Puyuhuapi channel, the eruptions filled part of the channel and separated Lake Risopatrón from it; this activity may have been phreatomagmatic in nature.

The cones were constructed by basaltic andesite, which contains clinopyroxene, olivine and plagioclase. The petrologically primitive composition suggests that they were constructed from primitive asthenosphere derived magmas that reached the surface directly, through the Liquiñe-Ofqui fault system. 

The cones may be extremely young, one eruption with a volume of about  may have occurred about 9,000 years ago based on stratigraphy, although the date is fairly uncertain. The glacial isostasy phenomena at the end of the last ice age may have triggered the magma ascent and thus eruptions.

See also
 List of volcanoes in Chile

References

Sources 

 
 

Mountains of Chile
Cinder cones of Chile
Volcanic groups
Volcanoes of Aysén Region